Ghost Town Live is a live album by The Specials, recorded at the Montreux Jazz Festival in 1995 and released in 1999 (see 1999 in music).

Track listing
"(Dawning of A) New Era" - 2:30
"Do the Dog" - 2:07
"Rat Race" - 3:17
"It's Up to You" - 3:22
"Man at C&A" - 3:04
"Hey, Little Rich Girl" - 3:40
"Wear You to the Ball" - 4:08
"Rude Boys Outta Jail" - 2:42
"Do Nothing" - 3:37
"Pressure Drop" - 3:55
"Doesn't Make It Alright" - 3:35
"Stupid Marriage" - 6:47
"Enjoy Yourself (It's Later Than You Think)" - 3:23
"Too Much Too Young" - 3:04
"A Message to You Rudy" - 2:42
"Concrete Jungle" - 3:02
"Gangsters" - 3:47
"Too Hot" - 3:04
"Monkey Man" - 2:28
"The Farmyard Connection" - 2:38
"Ghost Town" - 6:50

Personnel
The Specials
Neville Staple - vocals
Roddy Radiation - guitar, vocals
Lynval Golding - guitar, vocals
Horace Panter - bass guitar
Mark Adams - keyboards
Adam Birch - trombone
Aitch Benbridge - drums
Technical
Roger Lomas - producer, mixing, engineer, liner notes

1999 live albums
The Specials live albums
Albums recorded at the Montreux Jazz Festival